Steamchet Creek is a stream in Kootenai County, Idaho, in the United States. It flows into Lake Coeur d'Alene.

Steamchet is a name derived from the Coeur d'Alene language meaning "older daughter".

See also
List of rivers of Idaho

References

Rivers of Kootenai County, Idaho
Rivers of Idaho